Glasgow is a community located in the Regional Municipality of Durham in Ontario, Canada. It is located on the edge of lands designated for a future international airport (Pickering Airport), immediately east of the community of Stouffville and north of the ghost-town of Altona. There was a Mennonite church formed in Glasgow in 1930.

See also
List of communities in Ontario

References

Communities in the Regional Municipality of Durham